The Hienghène River is a river of northeastern New Caledonia. It has a catchment area of 155 square kilometres.

See also
List of rivers of New Caledonia

References

Rivers of New Caledonia